Bowater v Northwest London Hospitals NHS Trust [2011] EWCA Civ 63 is a UK labour law case, concerning unfair dismissal.

Facts
An employer argued a nurse who, while physically restraining a naked patient, said “It's been a few months since I have been in this position with a man underneath me” was lewd and deserved dismissal for her misconduct. The Tribunal said the dismissal was unfair.

Judgment
The Court of Appeal held the Tribunal had competently exercised its discretion in granting the unfair dismissal claim.

Notes

United Kingdom labour case law
Court of Appeal (England and Wales) cases
2011 in British law
2011 in case law